

The AirLony Skylane UL is a Czech two-seat, microlight, cabin monoplane manufactured by AirLony of Štětí.

The AirLony Skylane design was inspired by the much larger four-seat Cessna 182 Skylane, which it greatly resembles. The manufacturer calls it a  "small Cessna".

Design and development
The Skylane is a high-wing monoplane with a fixed nose-wheel landing gear and powered by a Rotax 912 piston engine. The enclosed cabin has side-by-side seating for two and dual yoke-style controls.

The aircraft is built from a combination  of wood and composites. The fuselage is of composite construction, while the strut-braced wing is of wooden structure with a semi-laminar MS (1)-313 airfoil and features a D-cell. The wing is fabric-covered and has two integral  fuel tanks. The wooden structure, fabric-covered and electrically operated flaps cover 39% of the wing chord and can be lowered to fixed positions of 13°, 29° and 37°.

The tail fin is of wood construction and features a NACA 0012 symmetrical airfoil. The main landing gear legs are made from fibreglass laminates and mount wheels with hydraulically operated toe-brakes. The nose wheel is of a fully castering design and can rotate 360°, allowing the aircraft to be pushed backwards while ground handling.

Specifications

References

Notes

Bibliography

External links

 Photo of an AirLony SkyLane on Airliners.net

2000s Czech civil utility aircraft
Skylane
Single-engined tractor aircraft
High-wing aircraft
Replica aircraft
Aircraft first flown in 2005